Marcela Marić (born 18 October 1996) is a Croatian diver. She competed in the women's 3 metre springboard at the 2016 Summer Olympics, where she finished 25th out of 29 competitors.

In 2019, she finished in 35th place in the preliminary round in the women's 1 metre springboard event at the 2019 World Aquatics Championships held in Gwangju, South Korea. In the women's 3 metre springboard event she finished in 44th place in the preliminary round.

Personal life 

Marić attends the University of Miami.

References

1996 births
Living people
Divers at the 2016 Summer Olympics
Croatian female divers
Olympic divers of Croatia
Miami Hurricanes women's divers
Sportspeople from Zadar